Humayun Mosque is situated in the village of Kachhpura in Agra on the left bank of River Yamuna.

History
Though this mosque has not been mentioned in texts related to Mughal period, it is the only monument in Agra that can undoubtedly be attributed to the reign of Humayun. According to the inscriptions on this monument, the mosque was constructed in 1530, when Humayun ascended the throne.

Architecture
The facade of the mosque bears five arches, the central of which is a high iwan. A dome tops the central nave, and is supported on kite-shaped pendentives and net squinches. There are double-aisled wings on either side of the central nave. The building is made of brick and lime, and covered with stucco work.

See also
 Moti Masjid, Agra
 Gyarah Sidi
 Mehtab Bagh
 Jama Masjid, Agra

References

Mughal mosques
Mosques in Agra
Religious buildings and structures completed in 1530